Petra Glavač is a Croatian football striker currently playing for ŽNK Agram in the Croatian First Division and the Croatian national team. She previously played for ŽNK Maksimir (with which she played the European Cup) and ŽNK Rijeka.

She made her two first appearances for Croatia in 2000 against the Czech Republic. Following a third cap in 2003 she wasn't called up for years, but she returned in 2010, and in October 2011 she scored her first goal in a 3-3 draw against Slovenia.

References

1982 births
Living people
Croatian women's footballers
Croatia women's international footballers
Women's association football forwards
Croatian Women's First Football League players
ŽNK Agram players
ŽNK Rijeka players
ŽNK Dinamo-Maksimir players